Robert A. "Bobby" Zirkin (born April 24, 1971) is an American politician from Maryland and a member of the Democratic Party. He represented Maryland's District 11 in Baltimore County in the Maryland House of Delegates from 1999 to 2007 and in the Maryland State Senate from 2007 to 2020.

Background
Born in Davis, California, Zirkin's family moved to Maryland while he was a child and Zirkin attended Baltimore County Public Schools, including Pikesville High School. He received a bachelor's degree from the Johns Hopkins University before earning a Juris Doctor degree from the Georgetown University Law Center before joining the Maryland Bar. London School of Economics, American University of Brussels, 1992; The Johns Hopkins University, B.A. (political science), 1993; Georgetown University Law Center, J.D., 1998. Admitted to Maryland Bar, 2000.

He is the Founder and Senior Partner at Zirkin & Schmerling Law, a full-service law firm based in Baltimore.

In the Legislature
Zirkin served two terms in the Maryland House of Delegates before winning an open seat in the State Senate in the 2006 election. He was a member of the Judicial Proceedings Committee; the Special Committee on Substance Abuse; the Joint Committee on Administrative, Executive and Legislative Review; and the Education, Health and Environmental Affairs Committee. In his first term, he was a member of the Budget and Taxation Committee and its public safety, transportation & environment subcommittee. Zirkin was also a member of the  Joint Committee on Children, Youth and Families; and the Joint Subcommittee on Program Open Space and Agricultural Land Preservation. Member, Education, Health and Environmental Affairs Committee, 2007 (environment subcommittee, 2007; ethics & election law subcommittee, 2007; special committee on renewables & clean energy, 2007).

Zirkin resigned from the Senate effective January 1, 2020, saying that politics has become too divisive and driven by special interests and social media. Since resigning, Zirkin has lobbied on behalf of the Catholic Church in opposition to proposed legislation that would extend the statute of limitations for child sex abuse cases.

In the Democratic Party
During the 2008 presidential campaign, Zirkin supported Barack Obama.

In 2014, State Senator Bobby Zirkin took over the Senate Judicial Proceedings Committee.

References

Democratic Party Maryland state senators
1971 births
Living people
Johns Hopkins University alumni
Georgetown University Law Center alumni
People from Baltimore County, Maryland
21st-century American politicians